When Dreams Come True is a 1929 American silent drama film directed by Duke Worne and starring Helene Costello, Rex Lease and Claire McDowell.

Synopsis
Ben Shelby, a blacksmith, is in love with Caroline Swayne but her wealthy father rejects the marriage. When he is found murdered shortly afterwards, suspicion falls on Shelby. However he is able to prove that he innocent, and identify the real culprit who killed Swayne to prevent his horse running in a major race.

Cast
 Helene Costello as Caroline Swayne
 Rex Lease as Ben Shelby
 Claire McDowell as Martha Shelby
 Danny Hoy as Jack Boyle
 Ernest Hilliard as Jim Leeson
 Buddy Brown as Billy Shelby
 George Periolat as Robert Swayne
 Emmett King as Judge Clayburn

References

Bibliography
 Munden, Kenneth White. The American Film Institute Catalog of Motion Pictures Produced in the United States, Part 1. University of California Press, 1997.

External links
 

1929 films
1929 drama films
1920s English-language films
American silent feature films
Silent American drama films
Films directed by Duke Worne
Rayart Pictures films
1920s American films